Don't Bore Us, Get to the Chorus! – Roxette's Greatest Video Hits is the second music video compilation by Swedish pop music duo Roxette, released on 20 December 1995 on VHS, LaserDisc and double VCD formats by EMI and Picture Music International. The video is a companion piece to the duo's first greatest hits compilation album, Don't Bore Us, Get to the Chorus! - Roxette's Greatest Hits, which had been released two months earlier.

Track listing
All songs written by Per Gessle, except "You Don't Understand Me" by Gessle and Desmond Child and "Listen to Your Heart", "Spending My Time", "(Do You Get) Excited?" and "Queen of Rain" by Gessle and Mats Persson. All songs produced by Clarence Öfwerman.

Charts

References

Roxette video albums
1995 video albums
Music video compilation albums
1995 compilation albums